Nafe Seluini is a Tonga international rugby league footballer who plays as a  for the Sunshine Coast Falcons in the Intrust Super Cup. He previously played for the Penrith Panthers and the Sydney Roosters in the NRL.

Playing career
A Mangere East Hawks junior in the Auckland Rugby League competition, Seluini began his career at the New Zealand Warriors, first playing in their Toyota Cup team in 2008. Seluini represented Tonga in a 2009 Test match against the New Zealand national rugby league team.

He was part of the Junior Warriors side that won the 2010 Toyota Cup Grand Final. He won the Warriors' 2010 NYC Player of the Year award and finished his career with fifty two Toyota Cup matches, twenty one tries and one goal.

In 2010 Seluini played for the Junior Kiwis before signing with the Penrith Panthers for the 2011 season.

Seluini made his first grade debut for the Penrith Panthers in Round 4 2011 against the Brisbane Broncos coming off the bench in the 18-10 loss. Seluini scored his first NRL try in round 8 against his former side the New Zealand Warriors.

In June 2012 Seluini made a mid-season switch, joining the Sydney Roosters on a one and a half year deal.

In October and November 2013, Seluini represented Tonga in the 2013 Rugby League World Cup.

In October 2015, Seluini played for Tonga in their Asia-Pacific Qualifier match against the Cook Islands for the 2017 Rugby League World Cup.

In 2016, Seluini signed with the Melbourne Storm. He played in the 2016 NRL Auckland Nines and also displaying skills for feeder club Sunshine Coast Falcons. In May he was part of Tonga team that played against Samoa in the 2016 Polynesian Cup.

References

External links
 Nafe Seluini NRL.com

1990 births
Living people
Burleigh Bears players
Junior Kiwis players
Mangere East Hawks players
New Zealand sportspeople of Tongan descent
New Zealand rugby league players
Newtown Jets NSW Cup players
Penrith Panthers players
People educated at St Paul's College, Auckland
Rugby league fullbacks
Rugby league hookers
Rugby league players from Auckland
Sunshine Coast Falcons players
Sydney Roosters players
Tonga national rugby league team players
Windsor Wolves players